Juan Ramón Virgen Pulido (born 9 April 1987) is a Mexican male volleyball and beach volleyball player.

With his club Tigres UANL he competed at the 2012 FIVB Volleyball Men's Club World Championship. As a beach volleyball player he competed at the 2013 Beach Volleyball World Championships and 2011 Pan American Games and 2015 Pan American Games. He qualified to compete at the 2016 Summer Olympics in Rio de Janeiro, in the men's tournament with Lombardo Ontiveros, but they lost in the Round of 16 against Reinder Nummerdor and Christiaan Varenhorst, from the Netherlands.

References

External links
 Profile at FIVB.org

1987 births
Living people
Mexican beach volleyball players
Mexican men's volleyball players
Men's beach volleyball players
Beach volleyball players at the 2015 Pan American Games
Beach volleyball players at the 2011 Pan American Games
Sportspeople from Nayarit
People from Santiago Ixcuintla
Olympic beach volleyball players of Mexico
Beach volleyball players at the 2016 Summer Olympics
Pan American Games medalists in volleyball
Pan American Games gold medalists for Mexico
Beach volleyball players at the 2019 Pan American Games
Medalists at the 2015 Pan American Games
Medalists at the 2019 Pan American Games